Bournemouth East and Christchurch is a former United Kingdom Parliamentary constituency. It returned one Member of Parliament, using the first past the post electoral system from the 1950 United Kingdom general election until the constituency was abolished in 1974.

The seat was based upon the eastern part of the seaside resort of Bournemouth and the neighbouring town of Christchurch, which were united for parliamentary purposes in 1950. The constituency was in the south west of the historic county of Hampshire in South East England.

It was held by the Conservative Party for the entirety of its existence, with the party gaining more than half of the votes cast at each election.

Boundaries
The County Borough of Bournemouth wards of Boscombe East, Boscombe West, King's Park, Queen's Park, Southbourne, and West Southbourne, and the Borough of Christchurch.

Before 1918 the County Borough of Bournemouth formed part of the then parliamentary borough of Christchurch. Under the Representation of the People Act 1918, Bournemouth became a single-member constituency, with the same boundaries as the then county borough. Christchurch became part of the new New Forest and Christchurch constituency.

In the 1950 redistribution of parliamentary seats, the Representation of the People Act 1948 provided for the division of Bournemouth and Christchurch into Bournemouth East and Christchurch and Bournemouth West.

In the 1974 redistribution, this constituency disappeared. The two new seats of Bournemouth East & Christchurch and Lymington then came into existence.

Members of Parliament

Elections

Elections in the 1950s

Elections in the 1960s

Elections in the 1970s

See also
List of former United Kingdom Parliament constituencies

References

 Boundaries of Parliamentary Constituencies 1885-1972, compiled and edited by F.W.S. Craig (Parliamentary Reference Publications 1972)
 British Parliamentary Election Results 1950-1973, compiled and edited by F.W.S. Craig (Parliamentary Research Services 1983)
 Who's Who of British Members of Parliament, Volume IV 1945-1979, edited by M. Stenton and S. Lees (Harvester Press 1981)

Parliamentary constituencies in Dorset (historic)
Parliamentary constituencies in Hampshire (historic)
Constituencies of the Parliament of the United Kingdom established in 1950
Constituencies of the Parliament of the United Kingdom disestablished in 1974